The Men's 10000 metres event was held on February 5. 9 athletes participated.

Schedule
All times are Almaty Time (UTC+06:00)

Records

Results

References

Men 10000